The 1972 Calder Cup playoffs of the American Hockey League began on April 4, 1972. The eight teams that qualified played best-of-seven series for Division Semifinals and Finals. The division champions played a best-of-seven series for the Calder Cup.  The Calder Cup Final ended on May 15, 1972, with the Nova Scotia Voyageurs, in their inaugural season in Nova Scotia, defeating the Baltimore Clippers four games to two to win the Calder Cup for the first time in team history. The Voyageurs also became the first Canadian team to win the Calder Cup.

Baltimore and Cincinnati set an AHL playoff record for most goals scored by both teams in one game with 18, when Baltimore beat Cincinnati 10-8 in game 5 of the Southern division final. Baltimore's Howie Menard set an AHL record for most points in one playoff game with 7 against Cleveland in game 5 of their Southern division semifinal. Two players have tied this record since then. Nova Scotia's Michel Plasse set an AHL record for lowest goals against average in one playoff, posting a 1.25 GAA.

Playoff seeds
After the 1971–72 AHL regular season, the top three teams from each division qualified for the playoffs. The Boston Braves finished the regular season with the best overall record, winning the head-to-head tiebreaker with Nova Scotia.

Eastern Division
Boston Braves - 96 points
Nova Scotia Voyageurs - 96 points
Springfield Kings - 77 points
Providence Reds - 67 points

Western Division
Baltimore Clippers - 79 points
Hershey Bears - 79 points
Cincinnati Swords - 78 points
Cleveland Barons - 74 points

Bracket

In each round, the higher seed receives home ice advantage, meaning they receive the "extra" game on home-ice if the series reaches the maximum number of games. There is no set series format due to arena scheduling conflicts and travel considerations.

Division Semifinals 
Note: Home team is listed first.

Eastern Division

(1) Boston Braves vs. (4) Providence Reds

(2) Nova Scotia Voyageurs vs. (3) Springfield Kings

Western Division

(1) Baltimore Clippers vs. (4) Cleveland Barons

(2) Hershey Bears vs. (3) Cincinnati Swords

Division Finals

Eastern Division

(1) Boston Braves vs. (2) Nova Scotia Voyageurs

Western Division

(1) Baltimore Clippers vs. (3) Cincinnati Swords

Calder Cup Final

(W1) Baltimore Clippers vs. (E2) Nova Scotia Voyageurs

See also
1971–72 AHL season
List of AHL seasons

References

Calder Cup
Calder Cup playoffs